Selayang Municipal Council Stadium (Malay: Stadium Majlis Perbandaran Selayang) is a multi-purpose stadium in Selayang, Gombak District, Selangor, Malaysia. The stadium is owned by the Majlis Perbandaran Selayang (MPS). It is currently used mostly for football matches.
The stadium has a capacity of 16,000. The tenants of the stadium is Selangor United.

History
Construction began in September 1997 and finished construction in September 1999. The stadium was officially opened and inaugurated on 26 November 1999 by former Menteri Besar of Selangor, Abu Hassan Omar.

Recent tournament results

2017 Southeast Asian Games

Footnotes

Football venues in Malaysia
Athletics (track and field) venues in Malaysia
Multi-purpose stadiums in Malaysia
Sports venues in Selangor
Kuantan FA
UKM F.C.